Gary Edward Lucy (born 27 November 1981) is an English actor, television personality and model who is best known for playing Will Fletcher in the ITV police drama The Bill, Luke Morgan in  Hollyoaks, Kyle Pascoe in Footballer's Wives and Danny Pennant in the BBC soap opera EastEnders. He also played a part in the show The Dumping Ground as a footballer named Billy.

Career
Lucy was born in Chigwell, Essex. He appeared in Grange Hill and Dream Team before getting the role that brought him to public attention, Luke Morgan in the Channel 4 soap opera Hollyoaks. Lucy undertook a male rape storyline, for which he won the Best Newcomer award at the 2000 British Soap Awards. Lucy then went on to do three series of the ITV football drama Footballers' Wives where he played Kyle Pascoe, a football player for fictional football club Earl's Park. In 2004, Lucy starred as Michael Sands with Ray Winstone in the ITV drama She's Gone. From 2005 to 2010, he portrayed P/DC Will Fletcher in the ITV police drama The Bill and appeared in Sky1 show The Match. In 2009, he took part and appeared in the drama film, Whatever It Takes. That same year, he departed from The Bill to "explore other projects". Lucy took part in the fifth series of the ITV talent show Dancing on Ice, paired with series regular skater Maria Fillipov. On 28 March 2010, Lucy finished as runner-up.  On 29 November 2010, he appeared as Ben Lloyd in an episode of the BBC One drama Missing.

On 27 September 2012, Lucy made his first screen appearance as Danny Pennant in the BBC soap opera EastEnders. On 6 March 2013, it was announced that Lucy would be returning to EastEnders as a permanent cast member.

In early 2014, Lucy appeared again as a contestant in the 'All-Stars Series' of Dancing on Ice. He was paired with series regular and skater Katie Stainsby.

In September 2014, Lucy began playing the lead role of Gaz in the touring production of The Full Monty.

In July 2014, it was announced that Lucy would appear in one episode of BBC medical drama Casualty as patient Val Kildare. He was described as "a loveable rogue, born charmer and conman who exists very much on the wrong side of the tracks". He appeared on 15 November 2014. He also played a part in the CBBC show The Dumping Ground as a footballer named Billy who was the fantasised father of character Finn.

In 2017, Lucy returned to Hollyoaks. He took a break from the series in 2018 to appear in a play. The character made a few brief appearances throughout 2019 before he returned permanently in August of that year.

Personal life
Lucy attended Trinity Catholic High School in Woodford Green, Essex. He had his own company, Gary Lucy Real Estate, however this was dissolved in 2014.

Lucy married Natasha Gray on 16 November 2014 and was covered and featured with a magazine deal with OK!. They have two daughters and two sons.

In November 2018 it was announced that Lucy and Gray had separated.

Filmography

Theatre
 The Full Monty (musical) – 2014–present, stage adaptation of the film The Full Monty, Theatre Royal, Newcastle

In November 2021, he appeared as a guest star in "The Play What I Wrote", a tribute to Morcambe and Wise, playing himself.

References

External links
 

1981 births
Living people
English male models
People from Chigwell
English male soap opera actors
English male stage actors
Male actors from Essex